Baumann may refer to:

 Baumann (surname)
 Mount Baumann, mountain in Togo

See also
 Baumann's Cave
 Bauman
 Bowman (disambiguation)
 Paumann